Uranium iodide may refer to one of three chemical compounds:

 Uranium triiodide, UI3
 Uranium(IV) iodide (or Uranium tetraiodide), UI4
 Uranium pentaiodide, UI5